Caritina Sáenz Vargas (born 8 August 1963) is a Mexican politician from the Institutional Revolutionary Party. From 2010 to 2012 she served as Deputy of the LXI Legislature of the Mexican Congress representing the State of Mexico.

References

1963 births
Living people
Politicians from the State of Mexico
Women members of the Chamber of Deputies (Mexico)
Ecologist Green Party of Mexico politicians
21st-century Mexican politicians
21st-century Mexican women politicians
Deputies of the LXI Legislature of Mexico
Members of the Chamber of Deputies (Mexico) for the State of Mexico